Joel D. Katz  (born 1954) is a Canadian psychologist and researcher. He is a Distinguished Research Professor and Canada Research Chair in Health Psychology at York University. He also serves as the research director of the pain research unit in the Department of Anesthesia and pain management at the Toronto General Hospital in addition to serving as a professor in the Department of Anesthesia at the University of Toronto.

Early life and education
Katz earned his Bachelor of Arts degree from McGill University in Montreal before enrolling in Dalhousie University for his Master's degree. While at Dalhousie, he studied speech perception in infants before accepting a position at the Montreal General Hospital's Pain Center as a research assistant. While working at the Montreal General Hospital Pain Centre with the late Dr. Ronald Melzack, Katz interacted with amputees experiencing phantom pains, which he dubbed "somatosensory pain memories." This sparked his interest in pain research. He and Melzack also evaluated the efficacy of auriculotherapy in reducing phantom limb pain. He spent two years at the hospital before re-enrolling in at McGill for his doctorate under Dr. Melzack's supervision.

Career
In 1990, Katz moved to Toronto where he conducted his postdoctoral work in the Departments of Psychology and Anesthesia & Pain Management at the Toronto General Hospital. While there, he co-authored a review of clinical and experimental evidence towards pain titled Contribution of central neuroplasticity to pathological pain: review of clinical and experimental evidence. He also embarked on several studies with the late Brian P. Kavanagh and other colleagues testing a hypothesis that derived from his doctoral research that when it works, pre-emptive analgesia reduces acute pain after surgery because it blocks the formation of a somatosensory memory-like mechanism in the spinal cord.

Katz joined the faculty in the Department of Psychology as a professor and Canada Research Chair in Health Psychology at York University in 2002. He co-conducted studies in pain management and control post-surgery with colleagues at the University Health Network in Toronto. Their research discovered that those who received preemptive or preventive pain control showed a reduction in pain disability within three weeks after surgery. Katz found that while regional anesthesia was successful in reducing the intensity of acute pain, there was not enough conclusive research to show that it preempted chronic pain. Katz later received the University of Toronto's Department of Anesthesia 2007 Faculty Research Award and York's 2011 Faculty Teaching Award.

In 2013, Katz co-authored a study with Gabrielle Pagé which found that children who experienced extreme and unpleasant pain post-surgery were more likely to develop moderate to severe pain within six months. Katz also led a study which used an eye-tracker device to test reaction times when people with chronic pain looked at pain-related and neutral words.  In 2014, Katz and Dr. Hance Clarke, Director of Pain Services at the Toronto General Hospital, co-founded the Transitional Pain Service, the world's first service designed to prevent and manage chronic postsurgical pain. The service functioned by intervening early during three stages of the surgical trajectory and diagnosing patients at high risk for developing chronic pain.

As a result, he received the Canadian Pain Society's 2013 Distinguished Career Award for "his outstanding achievements and contributions to pain research and pain management" and their 2016 Outstanding Pain Mentorship Award. That same year, Katz was renewed as a Canada Research Chair in Health Psychology and was appointed editor-in-chief of the Canadian Journal of Pain. On March 9, 2016, Katz was the recipient of the Canadian Psychological Association's Donald O. Hebb Award for Distinguished Contributions to Psychology as a Science.

At the conclusion of the 2016–17 academic year, Katz and Jonathan Edmondson were appointed Distinguished Research Professorship for their "outstanding contributions to the University through research". On September 26, 2017, Katz was named a fellow of the Canadian Academy of Health Sciences alongside Paul McDonald, Dean of the Faculty of Health at York University.  In 2018, Katz, Jane Heffernan, and Paul Ritvo worked alongside app developer ManagingLife to be the first researchers to define pain volatility through prediction models. Their analysis was published in the Journal of Medical Internet Research and found that pain management apps such as "Manage My Pain" could help shape future treatments of pain.

On April 16, 2019, Katz was appointed a Fellow of the American Psychological Association's Society of Clinical Child and Adolescent Psychology. A few months later, he was recognized by the Expertscape,  an online database that ranks individuals and institutions by their expertise, as a "World Expert in postoperative pain research."

References

External links

Living people
1954 births
McGill University alumni
Dalhousie University alumni
Academic staff of York University
Academic staff of the University of Toronto
Medical journal editors
Fellows of the Canadian Academy of Health Sciences
Fellows of the American Psychological Association
Canada Research Chairs